Canada is scheduled to compete at the 2024 Summer Olympics in Paris, France from July 26 to August 11, 2024. Since Canada's debut in 1900, Canadian athletes have appeared in every edition of the Summer Olympic Games, except for the 1980 Summer Olympics in Moscow because of the country's support for United States-led boycott.

Administration
In May 2022, Atlanta 1996 gold medalist Bruny Surin was named as the country's Chef De Mission. Surin was chosen for his athletic accomplishments, philanthropy, motivational speaking skills and for being a role model for young athletes.

Competitors
The following is the list of number of competitors who will compete in the Games.

Athletics (track and field)

Canadian track and field athletes achieved entry standards for Paris 2024, either by passing the direct qualifying mark (or time for track and road races) or by world ranking, in the following events (a maximum of 3 athletes each):

Track and road events

Gymnastics

Artistic
Canada qualified a full team of five female gymnasts after winning the bronze medal in the team all-around at the 2022 World Championships in Liverpool, Great Britain.

Women
Team

See also
Canada at the 2022 Commonwealth Games
Canada at the 2023 Pan American Games

References

Nations at the 2024 Summer Olympics
2024
2024 in Canadian sports